Søndergaard is a Danish surname, literally meaning south farm. Note that the double a is equivalent of å in common nouns and is retained from the pre-1948 orthography in proper nouns only.

Søndergaard is the surname of:

Arts and entertainment
Gale Sondergaard (1899–1985), American actress
Hester Sondergaard (1903–1994), American actress
Quentin Sondergaard (1925–1984), American actor
Povl Søndergaard (1905–1986), Danish sculptor
Sanne Søndergaard (born 1980), Danish writer and stand-up comedian
Trine Søndergaard (born 1972), Danish visual artist and photographer

Sport
Noah Syndergaard (born 1992), American baseball player
Søren Fjordback Søndergaard (born 1966), Danish boxer
Thomas Søndergård (born 1969), Danish conductor and percussionist

Other
Søren Søndergaard (politician) (born 1955), Danish politician

Danish-language surnames